Pentti Jaakko Jouppila (16 September 1923 – 15 September 1950) was a Finnish shot putter who competed in the 1948 Summer Olympics. He committed suicide by gunshot in 1950 after fatally shooting his wife at Seinäjoki train station.

Biography
He was born on 16 September 1923 in the Finnish city of Seinäjoki. He would go on to become a professional shot putter, competing in the 1948 Summer Olympics held in England following the Second World War. On 15 September 1950, he would commit suicide while in his hometown of Seinäjoki.

References

1923 births
1950 suicides
Olympic athletes of Finland
Athletes (track and field) at the 1948 Summer Olympics
Finnish male shot putters
Suicides by firearm in Finland
Murder–suicides in Finland
Uxoricides
People from Seinäjoki
Sportspeople from South Ostrobothnia